The qualifying competition for the 1980 CONCACAF Men's Pre-Olympic Tournament determined the three teams for the final tournament.

North American Zone

First round

Notes

Second round

Central American Zone

First round

Second round

Playoff

Caribbean Zone

First round

Second round

Playoff

Third round

Playoff

References

CONCACAF Men's Olympic Qualifying Tournament
1980 in sports